The Arado Ar 77 was a German twin-engined monoplane, designed as an advanced training aircraft from 1934.

Design
The Ar 77 had a thick cantilevered wooden wing, which was skinned with plywood on the undersurfaces and covered with fabric on the upper surfaces. The fuselage was built up from welded steel tubing covered with fabric. Tail surfaces were built up from steel tubing and were also fabric-covered, not following Arado's trademark layout of a fin and rudder forward of the tailplane. Instead the tailplane was high-mounted on the fin and supported by steel tube 'N' struts. Elevators and rudder were covered with fabric, aerodynamically balanced in the Ar 77A and without aerodynamic balance horns in the Ar 77B. The fixed tailwheel undercarriage consisted of cantilevered oleo-pneumatic main leg struts fitted with brakes and a tailwheel under the rear fuselage. The four crew members, being pilot, navigator or instructor, and two students, were accommodated in a cabin with full-length windows along the fuselage sides.

The Arado Ar 77 was characterised by the relatively low placement of its engines in relationship to the wings. There was room for two people in the cockpit, and four other people, such as radio operators, in the fuselage. However, the Luftwaffe criticized the aircraft, instead, preferring the Focke-Wulf Fw 58.

Variants
Data from:
Ar 77a
The first prototype crew trainer, constructed using Duralumin and wood.
Ar 77b
The second prototype constructed largely of wood
Ar 77A
The proposed production version of the Ar 77a
Ar 77B
A proposed version with tail surfaces that were not aerodynamically balanced, based on the Ar 77b.

Specifications (Ar 77A)

Notes

References

 Michael J. H. Taylor, Jane's Encyclopedia of Aviation. Studio Editions, London (1989)

Ar 77
1930s German aircraft
Aircraft first flown in 1934
Low-wing aircraft
Twin-engined tractor aircraft